Julio Cesar Peguero Santana (born September 7, 1968 in San Isidro, Dominican Republic) is a former professional baseball player. He appeared in 14 games for the Philadelphia Phillies of Major League Baseball in 1992, all as an outfielder. Overall, his professional career spanned 14 seasons, from 1987 until 2000.

External links

1968 births
Living people
Albuquerque Dukes players
Canton-Akron Indians players
Diablos Rojos del México players
Dominican Republic expatriate baseball players in Mexico
Dominican Republic expatriate baseball players in the United States
Harrisburg Senators players
Langosteros de Cancún players
Langosteros de Quintana Roo players
Macon Pirates players
Major League Baseball center fielders
Major League Baseball players from the Dominican Republic
Major League Baseball right fielders
Mexican League baseball center fielders
Mexican League baseball first basemen
Olmecas de Tabasco players
Petroleros de Minatitlán players
Philadelphia Phillies players
Port City Roosters players
Potros de Minatitlán players
Reading Phillies players
Riverside Pilots players
Salem Buccaneers players
Scranton/Wilkes-Barre Red Barons players
Tacoma Rainiers players